is a former Nippon Professional Baseball player for the Seibu Lions in Japan's Pacific League.

External links

1962 births
Kintetsu Buffaloes players
Japanese baseball coaches
Japanese expatriate baseball players in the United States
Living people
Nippon Professional Baseball coaches
Nippon Professional Baseball outfielders
Osaka Kintetsu Buffaloes players
San Jose Bees players
Seibu Lions players
Baseball people from Miyagi Prefecture